In Search of Tomorrow is a 2022 documentary film, written and directed by David A. Weiner. It takes the viewer on a year-by-year deep dive into science fiction films of the 1980s, such as Star Wars (namely The Empire Strikes Back and Return of the Jedi), Star Trek II: The Wrath of Khan, Blade Runner, E.T. the Extra-Terrestrial, Back to the Future, Dune, RoboCop, Aliens, Tron, WarGames, The Terminator, Ghostbusters, Predator, Akira, The Road Warrior, The Abyss, Short Circuit, and several more. The film also examines the science and technology behind the fiction amid insider tales of the creative process.

The documentary features original interviews of key '80s sci-fi filmmakers, actors, special-effects and visual effects masters, as well as tech advisors, authors, influencers, composers and visionaries. Interspersed between the yearly timelines is a wide range of chapters that delve deeper into the intricacies of specific aspects of the movies including, worldbuilding, storytelling, character definition, costume design, and more.

Cast

 Lance Guest
 Clancy Brown
 Sean Young
 Wil Wheaton
 Catherine Mary Stewart
 John Carpenter
 Adrienne Barbeau
 Paul Verhoeven
 Peter Weller
 Nancy Allen
 Kurtwood Smith
 Jenette Goldstein
 Joe Dante 
 Carrie Henn
 Bruce Boxleitner
 Shane Black
 Dee Wallace
 Mark Rolston
 Barry Bostwick
 Ivan Reitman
 Billy Dee Williams
 Ronny Cox
 Bill Duke
 Alex Winter
 Jesse Ventura
 Gene Simmons
 Bob Gale
 John Knoll 
 Oliver Harper
 Corey Dee Williams
 Adam Nimoy
 Brad Fiedel
 William Sandell
 Stewart Raffill
 Ed Gale

Synopsis
The documentary follows a year-by-year timeline, where each film segment combine talent from the project and/or experts discussing aspects such as plot, the film's emotional and cultural impact, behind-the-scenes anecdotes, toys, tie-ins and marketing, creative visions influencing contemporary tech/architecture/landscape design.

It also contains interstitial chapters that further explores themes such as:
 Heroes and Heroines: Hear from the actors, writers, directors, and producers who brought sci-fi icons such as Rick Deckard, Ellen Ripley, and the Terminator to movie screens.
 SFX Breakdowns: Learn how robot, creature, and spaceship effects were created. The filmmakers will be interviewing the artists who designed and operated the models, puppets, and animatronics that brought creatures and characters to life.
 Production Design & Worldbuilding: Learn about the creation of the costumes, weapons, and post-apocalyptic landscapes that set the scene for audiences' favorite stories.
 Socio/Political Context: How '80s sci-fi reflected the socio-political context in which it was made: Tech advances, Reaganomics, Live Aid, big business, and the AIDS crisis.
 Genre Mixing: Exploring how other genres - fantasy, action, horror, and comedy - are very much intertwined with the sci-fi genre. Where does one begin and the other end?
 Legacy: Discuss the importance of '80s sci-fi genre in a modern-day context. Why is '80s sci-fi still so relevant today?

Pre-release reception
Specialized media Nerdist references director David A. Weiner, detailing "In Search of Tomorrow promises to be an even more ambitious film journey worthy of the amazing content and creators that came out of '80s Sci-Fi cinema: A celebration of human potential, exploring the most inspiring and eclectic movies of the decade, year-by year, that firmly captured our collective imaginations and changed our lives".

In May 2020, /Film blog wrote, "The doc is billed as a 'love-letter to the Sci-Fi films we grew up with; the films that dared to ask, "what if?" and offered us a vision of future technology, society, and culture that simultaneously delighted, amazed and scared us.'"

Kervyn Cloete, from CriticalHit wrote, "As somebody who grew up with many of these films, I can’t wait to watch this documentary".

See also
Science fiction film

References

External links 
 
 Movie trailer

2022 films
2022 documentary films
British documentary films
Documentary films about films
2020s English-language films
Films directed by David A. Weiner
2020s British films